Khaleda Ekram (6 August 1950 – 24 May 2016) was a Bangladeshi architect, professor, researcher, and academician. She served as the 12th vice-chancellor of Bangladesh University of Engineering and Technology (BUET). She was the former dean of the faculty of architecture and planning and head of the department of architecture, Bangladesh University of Engineering and Technology (BUET). She was the first woman to be appointed as the vice-chancellor of BUET. She held the position since September 2014 until her death in May 2016.

Early life and education 
Ekram was born on August 6, 1950, in Dhaka, to Ekram Hussain and Qamrunnessa Hussain. She had three sisters, Kamela Akhter Ishaque, Morsheda Karim, and Masuda Ahmed.

Ekram received her Bachelor of Architecture degree from Bangladesh University of Engineering and Technology in 1974. Her final year thesis project was titled "Tourist Resort at Cox’s Bazaar, Chittagong". She pursued higher education in urban planning and design in the United States, where she earned her graduate degree (MURP) from University of Hawaii in 1980. Her thesis title was "Revitalization of Residential Areas of Old Dhaka". In 1992, she completed post-graduate courses in Architecture and Development at Lund University in Sweden.

Career 
Ekram began her career in 1974 as a junior architect at Bastukalabid Limited in Dhaka.  She also worked for Parikalpak Sangstha Limited, for a brief period in 1975. In the same year, she began her four-decade-long teaching career with the Department of Architecture of BUET. She first joined as a lecturer and then became assistant professor in 1977. Her areas of interest included housing, community development, urban design, urban planning and gender issues.

After graduating from the University of Hawaii in Urban and Regional Planning, she worked as assistant architect planner at Honolulu-based Michael T. Suzuki & Associates, from December 1980 to May 1981. She also worked at East West Center and contributed in community service projects in Honolulu.

Upon coming back to Bangladesh, she resumed her assistant professor role in BUET and became associate professor in 1986 and professor in 1995. She went on to become the head of the department in 1997 and the dean of the faculty of architecture and planning in 1999.

On September 11, 2014, the Education Ministry of Bangladesh appointed Ekram as the first female vice-chancellor of BUET.  She was also the second female to hold the position of VC in the history of the nation. However, only two days after her appointment, Teachers' Association of BUET raised their opposition against the new VC, alleging that seniority has been violated in her appointment. They argued that BUET VCs were appointed based on their seniority and Khaleda Ekram was the 26th senior-most professor in BUET and hence was not eligible for the post. Eventually, the controversy died down and Ekram was able to serve 20 months out of her 4-year term until she became seriously ill in 2016. Within this short period of time, she proved her administrative skills and was credited with bringing back the academic discipline by reducing 'session jam' of BUET. She also patronized and facilitated many extra-curricular activities for the students in an attempt to improve their college experience.

Awards and honors 
 Outstanding Alumni Award of the department of Urban and Regional Planning, University of Hawaii, Hawaii, USA, November 2010.
 Chair, Executive Board, East West Center Association (EWCA), Honolulu, Hawaii, USA from July 2007 to July 2010.
 President, Women Architects, Engineers, Planners Association (WAEPA) Bangladesh from 2009 to 2016.
 Member, Executive Board, East West Center Association (EWCA), Honolulu, Hawaii, USA from July 2005 to July 2007.
 Resource person on Commonwealth Association of Architects (CAA) Visiting Board (a full- scale visit – category 4) of the department of architecture, Manipal Institute of Technology, India, Sept. 21–27, 1997; Rizvi College of Architecture and Kamla Raheja Vidyanidhi Institute for Architecture, & Environmental Studies, Mumbai, India, December 4 – 11, 2005. 
 Gender Advisor (From Oct. 1992 to Dec. 2004), Gender Strategy Component (from 2001 known as Gender Equality Policy Group), University of Alberta – BUET Institutional Linkage Project, BUET, Dhaka, Funded by Canadian International Development Agency.
 Honorary Advisor, Bibi Khadeja Kalayan Sangstha, a Nonprofit Welfare Association from 1995 to 2016; raised funds during Natural Calamities, arranged free schooling for under privileged kids, set up cutting and sewing classes for women.
 Nominated External Supervisor of two graduate students, the University of Karlskrona/ Ronneby, Sweden, January 1993 (Due to unavoidable circumstances the students could not come to Bangladesh).
 Stood First Class Second in order of merit among 37 students in the B. Arch. Examination, 1974.
 Anannya Top Ten Awards (2014)

Personal life and death 
Ekram was married to Architect Haroon ur Rashid. Together they had two daughters, Mariam Ali, an environmentalist, Mashida Rashid, a public health specialist, and a son, Khaled Yasin Rashid, also an environmentalist.

On 11 May 2016, Ekram was admitted to Square Hospital in Dhaka after being diagnosed with non-Hodgkin Lymphoma disease. When her condition deteriorated, she was flown to Bangkok on May 14. She died at the hospital 10 days later. She was buried in her mother's grave at the Banani Graveyard in Dhaka.

Publications 

 Urban Open Space System of Dhaka City –Need and Possibilities of Intervention, proceedings of International Seminar on Architecture: Overcoming Constraints, June 11–13, 2003, Dhaka, 
 Architectural Education and Means, in PROTIBESH, a journal of the department of architecture, BUET, Volume viii, No. 1, Dhaka, 1994, pp. 99–105.
 Problems and prospects of Conservation Study in Dhaka, 1993, published in the Architectural Conservation Bangladesh by Asiatic Society of Bangladesh, Edited by A. H. Imamuddin, Dhaka, Dec. 1993, pp. 111–124.
 Tall Buildings in Urban Design; published in the Proceedings of the International Conference on Tall Buildings in Developing Countries, Dhaka, June 1993, pp. 15–23.
 Women in Development: Technical Profession and Education, excerpts of the proceedings of the Workshop published in Gender Perspective, CIDA Bangladesh Programme, Dhaka, March 1993, pp. 10–11.
 Women Resources in the Development of Bangladesh, published in the Proceedings of the International Seminar on Human Resources Development in Islamic Countries: Challenges in the 21st Century, Oct. 1992, pp. 13–19.
 Housing the Urban Poor—A resettlement Project for Squatters at Mirpur, Dhaka, Bangladesh, Architecture and Development 1992, Lund Centre for Habitat Studies, Lund University, Sweden, June 1992, pp. 357–373.
 Pourashavas and Urban Development in PROTIBESH (ENVIRONMENT), a journal of the department of architecture, BUET, Dhaka, Vol. IV, No. 1, May 1991, pp. 53–62.
 Planning Tools for Architectural Conservation, published in ARCHITECTURE AND URBAN CONSERVATION IN THE ISLAMIC WORLD, Vol. One; publication of The Aga Khan Trust for Culture, Geneva, 1990, pp. 68–72.
 Contributed paper in Contemporary Architecture Bangladesh, on Cultural and Institutional Buildings, edited by Shah Alam Zahiruddin and others, a publication of the Institute of Architects Bangladesh (IAB), March 1990, pp. 67–71.
 Thoughts on Urban Planning and Development in Bangladesh, published in PROTIBESH (ENVIRONMENT) a journal of the department of architecture, BUET, Dhaka, Vol. III, No: 2, 1989, pp. 71–74.
 Conservation of Ahsan Manzil—A step in the Right Direction, Published in AIH JANALA, students’ journal of the department of architecture, BUET, March, 1988, pp. 12–14.(was editorial adviser of this special issue).
 Building Construction Regulations, 1984—An Evaluation, published in ENVIRONMENT, a Journal of the Faculty of Architecture and Planning, BUET, Dhaka, No.2, June, 1987, pp. 49–54.(was editor of this issue).
 Old Dhaka – A Case for Conservation, published in REGIONALISM IN ARCHITECTURE, a publication of the Aga Khan Award for Architecture, Geneva, 1985, pp. 101–106.
 Women in Technical Education and Profession, editorial advisor of the supplement in ‘The Daily Star’ Dhaka, May 13, 1997, pp. 8–9.
 Book review of Rural Settlement in Bangladesh, Spatial Pattern and development, author Sabiha Sultana, published in Earth, Dhaka, Sept. 1996
 Mosques of Dhaka, Do They Represent the Periods They Belong To?, published in the Weekend Magazine of The Daily Star, Dhaka March 17, 1995, pp. 9–10.
 Valedictory Speech ‘Embracing Knowledge, Overcoming Barriers’, National Institute of Technology (NIT), Agartala, India: August, 2015 
 Existence, Use and Impact of Urban Community Open Spaces, Dhaka, Bangladesh, Paper Presented at International Symposium, ‘Towards a better Future: Environmental and Social Concern in architecture’, IAP, Lahore Chapter, April 25–27, 2006; Lahore, Pakistan
 Women Entrepreneurship Development in Bangladesh --- Case Studies, paper read at the Women in Leadership seminar, August 18–22, 2003, Sydney, Australia, Organized by the East West Center Association, the Global Banking Alliance for Women and the Westpac Bank
 Social Attitude towards Technical Education and Profession for women in Bangladesh, paper presented in the EWC/ EWCA 2002 International Conference on ‘the Impact of Globalization on Building an Asia Pacific Community’, July 1–4, 2002, Kuala Lumpur, Malaysia
 Mansions and Villas of Old Dhaka, a paper presented at the International workshop on Architectural and Urban Conservation. Calcutta, India, December, 1994

References

External links

1950 births
2016 deaths
Bangladeshi women architects
Bangladesh University of Engineering and Technology alumni
University of Hawaiʻi at Mānoa alumni
Academic staff of Bangladesh University of Engineering and Technology
Vice-Chancellors of Bangladesh University of Engineering and Technology
Deans (academic)
Women deans (academic)
Bangladeshi academic administrators
Bangladeshi women academics
Deaths from cancer in Thailand
Deaths from non-Hodgkin lymphoma
Burials at Banani Graveyard